The Georgetown Steam Plant, located in the Georgetown neighborhood of Seattle, Washington, was constructed in 1906 for the Seattle Electric Company to provide power for Seattle, notably for streetcars.

History
The plant was originally built by Stone and Webster in 1906. One of the first reinforced concrete structures on the U.S. West Coast, it originally provided power for the Interurban Railway between Seattle and Tacoma; it also provided both direct current for Seattle's streetcars and alternating current for Georgetown, then an independent city. They purchased General Electric steam turbine technology, based on patents originally held by inventor Charles Gordon Curtis. At the time, this was cutting edge technology, and the Georgetown Steam Plant "marks the beginning of the end of the reciprocating steam engine" as the dominant mode of generating electricity on a large scale.

Originally located along an oxbow of the Duwamish River to provide cooling water, the plant was left inland after the original river channel was straightened in 1917. Retired after nearly 75 years of operation, it remains "surprisingly complete and operable". The plant has three Curtis turbines, manufactured by the General Electric Company between 1906 and 1917.

Puget Sound Traction and Lighting Company (now Puget Sound Energy) bought the Seattle Electric Company in 1912; the Georgetown Steam Plant powered the Seattle-to-Tacoma Interurban and Seattle streetcars; it also provided residential and industrial power to Georgetown. Originally an oil-fired plant, it converted to a coal in 1917. As hydropower was developed in the 1910s and 1920s the steam plant became uncompetitive and only used for emergencies. It last produced electricity in January 1953 when water levels at the dams were low. Decommissioning took place in 1972.

Landmark and museum
The building was declared a National Historic Landmark in 1984, and is also designated by the American Society of Mechanical Engineers as a National Historic Mechanical Engineering Landmark. At the time of its landmarking, it contained the "last operating examples of the world's first large scale, steam turbine". The building itself, "built by a fast-track construction process, was designed and supervised by Frank W. Gilbreth, later a nationally famous proponent of efficiency engineering." The building is also a Seattle City Landmark and is on the Washington State Register of Historic Places.

Paul Carosino and Lilly Tellefson founded the Georgetown PowerPlant Museum in 1995 to restore, maintain and operate the plant. It now teaches boiler firemen and steam engineers.

The plant remains owned by Seattle City Light, the city's public electric utility. Since 2014 it has opened to the general public once a month, from 10am to 2pm on the second Saturday of each month.

The plant houses the last operable examples of early vertical Curtis steam generating turbines, as well as operational reciprocating steam engines, a collection of vintage machining tools, and several smaller steam engines.

The plant was the site of the last performance of the rock band Big Black.

Notes

References

 . PDF: 425 KiB.
  , National Register of Historic Places Inventory Nomination, National Park Service, 1984. Accessed 28 December 2007.
 .

External links

 Georgetown Steam Plant - City of Seattle
 ASME Historic Mechanical Engineering Landmarks #45 - Information on the museum
Seattle Electric Company's Georgetown Steam Plant - National Park Service

Museums in Seattle
Science museums in Washington (state)
Technology museums in the United States
National Register of Historic Places in Seattle
National Historic Landmarks in Washington (state)
Energy infrastructure on the National Register of Historic Places
Industry museums in Washington (state)
Railroad museums in Washington (state)
Steam museums in the United States
Buildings and structures in Seattle
Industrial buildings and structures on the National Register of Historic Places in Washington (state)
Railroad-related National Historic Landmarks
Georgetown, Seattle